Mohamed Afam Akram (Tamil: அபாம் அக்ரம்; Sinhala:අෆාම් අක්‍රම්ගේ; born 11 June 1998) is a Sri Lankan international footballer who plays as a forward for Renown SC.

International career
Akram made his senior international debut in a 4–0 away defeat to Cambodia. He came on at half time for Subash Madhushan, but was replaced after only 62 minutes by Rathnayake Nawarathna Warakagoda due to injury.

International statistics

References

1998 births
Living people
Sri Lankan footballers
Sri Lanka international footballers
Association football forwards
Sri Lanka Football Premier League players